Salimicrobium halophilum is a moderately halophilic bacterium from the genus of Salimicrobium which has been isolated from rotted wood in Japan.

References

Bacillaceae
Bacteria described in 1990